Burn the Priest is the debut studio album by the American heavy metal band Burn the Priest. The album was released on April 4, 1999 by Legion Records. It was the band's only release before being re-named to Lamb of God until the release of Legion: XX, and also the only album by the band to feature guitarist Abe Spear.

Track listing

Epic reissue
On Mar 22, 2005, it was re-released by Epic Records. The album has been remixed by Colin Richardson, remastered by Mark Wilder and features new liner notes by original producer Steve Austin (from noisecore band Today Is the Day). The cover art was changed in order to be store friendly, but retains the original artwork in the booklet. A live video of the song "Bloodletting", taken from the Killadelphia DVD was included on an enhanced portion of the disc in QuickTime format.

The inlay of the CD case reads "Der Teufel Nennt Mich Bruder", German for "The Devil Calls Me Brother".

Personnel

Burn the Priest
 Randy Blythe – lead vocals
 Mark Morton – guitar
 Abe Spear – guitar
 John Campbell – bass
 Chris Adler – drums, production

Additional personnel
 Michael Brosan – Backing vocals
 Steve Austin – vocals on "Resurrection #9", production, engineering, mixing, and mastering
 Remixed by Colin Richardson with Will Bartle (2005 Reissue)
 Remastered by Mark Wilder (2005 Reissue)

References 

1999 debut albums
Thrash metal albums by American artists
Death metal albums by American artists
Lamb of God (band) albums